Clarence James Goodnight (May 30, 1914 – August 9, 1987) was an American zoologist who made contributions to the study of freshwater annelids and harvestmen (Opiliones). He was professor at Brooklyn College, Purdue University, and Western Michigan University. Goodnight was born in Gillespie, Illinois. He earned an associate degree at Blackburn College, then earned his bachelor's, master's, and PhD at the University of Illinois. He produced over 150 publications, including three textbooks.  He served as president of the American Microscopical Society (1971), secretary of the American Society of Zoologists, and  secretary of the North American Benthological Society. In 1940 he married Marie Louise Ostendorf (1916–1998), with whom he co-authored many publications and described over 300 species, including more than 120 species of Mexican harvestmen.

Books
 (with M. L. Goodnight)
 (with M. L. Goodnight and R. R. Armacost)
 (with M. L. Goodnight and P. Gray)

References

External links

1914 births
1987 deaths
American arachnologists
20th-century American zoologists
People from Gillespie, Illinois
Brooklyn College faculty
Purdue University faculty
Western Michigan University faculty
Blackburn College (Illinois) alumni
University of Illinois alumni